Shayan TV is the first kids and teen's entertainment channel in Tatar language available in Russian Federation (through the Internet) with 24-hour broadcasting.

History 
Supported by the President of Tatarstan Republic, the channel was launched in Tatarstan Republic on 12 November 2018 as the first Tatar channel for kids and teens.

Contemporary programming 
The channel offers more than 20 original educational and learning programs, game shows and quizzes, animated films (popular science, documentary, feature films) dubbed in Tatar for audiences from 3 to 15 years old.

Shayan Channels services 

 There are special apps to follow the channel on smartphones in Google play and App store.
 The Channel has a YouTube channel, where videos from television series and films are posted.
 The official site of the Channel works in Tatar, Russian and English languages and gives an ability to follow the Channel 24-hours all over the World.

Awards 

 Shayan TV is the winner of the contest "The main heros - 2019" (held by Carousel International) in nomination "The discovery of the year".
 Shayan TV won the first place in the X-th World internet-projects contest "The Knowledge Pearls" ("Belem cäwhärläre") in nominations "The most popular and useful project in the fields of culture and education" and "The most popular and useful Tatar app".
 The broadcast "Kaleb" of the Channel became the winner of the IX-th All-Russian journalists and mass media contest in the nomination "The best achievements on the subject of lifestyle and activities of Tatar nation in mass media".

References

External links 
 
 Смотреть ШАЯН ТВ

Tatar-language mass media
Television channels in Russia
Television channels and stations established in 2018